Donna Jean Papa (born March 16, 1956) is an American softball coach. With a record of 1,295–719–4, she ranks 10th in wins in the history of college softball. She has been the head coach at the University of North Carolina since 1986. She was inducted into the National Fastpitch Coaches Association Hall of Fame.

Head coaching record

Softball

See also
 List of college softball coaches with 1,000 wins

References

1956 births
Living people
UConn Huskies softball players
North Carolina Tar Heels softball coaches
Sportspeople from Waterbury, Connecticut
Softball players from Connecticut
Female sports coaches
American softball coaches
UNC Greensboro Spartans softball coaches
St. John's Red Storm softball coaches
Susquehanna River Hawks softball coaches